Space Quest II: Chapter II – Vohaul's Revenge, commonly known as Space Quest II: Vohaul's Revenge, is a graphic adventure game released on November 14, 1987 by Sierra On-Line. It was the sequel to Space Quest I: The Sarien Encounter, again using Sierra's AGI game engine.

Plot 
A comic is included in the manual to explain to the player what events have occurred since Space Quest I, when Roger became Hero of Xenon. The player also learns of the villain Sludge Vohaul, who was behind the original Sarien attack of the Arcada, and how he was driven mad.

Despite his newfound status as hero, Roger is transferred to the Xenon Orbital Station 4 and promoted to Head (and only) Janitor. After some time he is abducted by Sludge Vohaul.

As Roger is being transported to the Labion labour mines as punishment for thwarting Sludge's original plan, the prison ship crash-lands in a nearby jungle upon the planet. He manages to escape his pursuers and the dangers of the Labion jungle and soon reaches Sludge's asteroid base, where he must stop Vohaul's evil plan to eradicate sentient life from Xenon by launching millions of cloned insurance salesmen at the planet.

Upon reaching Vohaul's control room, Roger is captured, miniaturized and kept in a glass jar. After escaping his glass prison, he manages to shut down Vohaul's life support system by getting inside the machine, thereby killing his enemy and restoring himself to full size.

At the end of the game, before blowing up Vohaul's asteroid and saving the world, Roger is left in cryo sleep inside a capsule floating in space, setting up the sequel, Space Quest III: The Pirates of Pestulon.

Reception 
Space Quest II was well received by both critics and consumers. As Computer Gaming World noted, "Though the game is similar to the original Space Quest, the addition of more detailed animation, more difficult puzzles, an improved parser (hurrah!), and greater scope makes a good game even better." Some criticisms leveled at the game included some objects' unclear descriptions, and some puzzles which are hidden from the player. Antic warned of the difficulty, stating that the ST version "is trickier than the original and graphically superior". Macworld wrote that "as in the original game, Space Quest II succeeds with the humor of its animation and scripting".

Space Quest II was listed number four in Sierra's Top 5 Bestsellers. Therefore, it can be assumed Space Quest II sold over 100,000 copies, thus earning the SPA (Software Publishers Association) Gold Medal. According to Sierra On-Line, combined sales of the Space Quest series surpassed 1.2 million units by the end of March 1996.

Remake 
Infamous Adventures announced on 1 April 2007 that they were remaking Space Quest II in the style of past VGA remakes, releasing screenshots and a demo along with the announcement. Infamous Adventures released their remake on New Year's Eve 2011, featuring a full-voice pack and extended content.

References 

1987 video games
Adventure games
Point-and-click adventure games
Apple IIGS games
Amiga games
Atari ST games
DOS games
ScummVM-supported games
Sierra Entertainment games
Space Quest
Video game sequels
1980s interactive fiction
Games commercially released with DOSBox
Video games developed in the United States